Haji Mohd Lazim Bridge or Tanjung Sedili Bridge (Malay: Jambatan Haji Mohd Lazim Jawi: جمبتن حاج محمد لازيم) is a river bridge in Sedili, Johor, Malaysia. The bridges crosses Sedili Besar River. A road bridge spans the river near its mouth close to the village of Tanjung Sedili. It spans 600 metres across the river and links the coastal regions to the north and south of the river. Its construction was completed in around 2006. It was named after Ustaz Haji Mohd Lazim bin Saim, an Islamic religious school teacher of the Madrasah Arabiah Kluang.

References

Bridges completed in 2009
Bridges in Johor
Kota Tinggi District